Alexander Calder (1806 – August 23, 1853) was the first mayor of Beaumont, Texas, on August 8, 1840.

Calder grew up in New York but moved to the Beaumont area in 1838. He became the clerk of the county court, and many early Jefferson County, Texas are in his handwriting.

Calder won the first mayoral election for the city of Beaumont on July 28, 1840, held under the Incorporation Act. Beaumont had incorporated as a city two years earlier.

Calder had a house at 600 Calder Avenue.

References

See also
List of mayors of Beaumont, Texas
Timeline of Beaumont, Texas

1806 births
1853 deaths
People from New York (state)
People from Beaumont, Texas
Texas lawyers
Mayors of places in Texas
19th-century American politicians
19th-century American lawyers